Panagiotes the Protopsaltes or Panagiotes the New Chrysaphes (c. 1622 – 1682) was a Greek composer, protopsaltes (first cantor) and poet in Constantinople, the capital of the Ottoman Empire.

Life and work 

He served as protopsaltes of the Ecumenical Patriarchate of Constantinople (about 1655 to 1682) and like the former protopsaltes Theophanes Karykes he became engaged in a revival of the Byzantine psaltic art or art of chant. As student of the patriarchal protopsaltes Georgios Raidestinos, his approach was based on the recomposition of the late medieval sticherarion as it was described by Manuel Chrysaphes in his treatise about psaltic art, and the recomposition of the Byzantine Anastasimatarion was based on the simple psalmody according to the Octoechos. Several manuscripts of the latter have survived since the 17th century and they were usually introduced by a Papadike treatise, the basic introduction (protheoria) into psaltic art. For these works he was called "the New Chrysaphes".

References

External links

Contemporary manuscripts

Transcriptions according to the New Method

Studies 

1620s births
1682 deaths
Byzantine composers
Composers from the Ottoman Empire
Eastern Orthodox liturgical music
Greeks from the Ottoman Empire
Musicians from Istanbul
17th-century classical composers
Male classical composers
17th-century Greek musicians
17th-century male musicians
Writers from Istanbul